Salamanca Airport  is the airport serving the province of Salamanca in the autonomous community of Castile and León. It is located in the municipalities of Machacón, Calvarrasa de Abajo y Villagonzalo de Tormes; and it is 15 km from Salamanca city.

Airlines and destinations

Statistics

References

External links
 Salamanca Airport Official Website (English) at Aena

Airports in Castile and León
Airports established in 1937